Kallithea, is a village and a community in the municipal unit of Alykes in the island of Zakynthos, Greece. In 2011 Kallithea's population was 238 people. It is situated at the eastern foot of the Vrachionas mountains, at about  elevation. The farm of the Science Park Zakynthos, a Norwegian-Greek institute that focuses on sustainable water use, is situated in Kallithea. The village suffered great damage from the 1953 Ionian earthquake.

Population

See also
List of settlements in Zakynthos

References

External links
Science Park Zakynthos - Greek-Norwegian educational and research collaboration on Zakynthos

Populated places in Zakynthos